Geleen-Lutterade railway station is located in the neighbourhood Lutterade within the municipality of Sittard-Geleen, the Netherlands. The station opened in 1862 on the Maastricht–Venlo railway. The station was originally called Geleen but later changed to Lutterade. The station received its current name in 1954.

Train services
The following train services by Arriva call at this station:
 Local stoptrein S2: Roermond–Sittard–Maastricht Randwyck

References

External links
NS website

Railway stations in Sittard-Geleen
Railway stations opened in 1862
Railway stations on the Staatslijn E
1862 establishments in the Netherlands
Railway stations in the Netherlands opened in the 19th century